Liroconite is a complex mineral: Hydrated copper aluminium arsenate hydroxide, with the formula Cu2Al[(OH)4|AsO4]·4(H2O). It is a vitreous monoclinic mineral, colored bright blue to green, often associated with malachite, azurite, olivenite, and clinoclase. It is quite soft, with a Mohs hardness of 2 - 2.5, and has a specific gravity of 2.9 - 3.0.

It was first identified in 1825 in the tin and copper mines of Devon and Cornwall, England. Although it remains quite rare it has subsequently been identified in a variety of locations including France, Germany, Australia, New Jersey and California.

The type locality for liroconite is Wheal Gorland in St Day, Cornwall in the United Kingdom. The largest crystal specimen on public display is in the Royal Cornwall Museum in Truro.

It occurs as a secondary mineral in copper deposits in association with olivenite, chalcophyllite, clinoclase, cornwallite, strashimirite, malachite, cuprite and limonite.

Structure
Liroconite crystallizes in the monoclinic crystal system. The crystal structure consists of a framework of AsO4 tetrahedra, Jahn-Teller-distorted [CuO2(OH)2(H2O)2] octahedra and [AlO2(OH)4] octahedra.

See also
Kernowite – an isostructural mineral with iron in place of aluminium

References

Copper(II) minerals
Arsenate minerals
Monoclinic minerals
Minerals in space group 15